The 2007–08 Washington State Cougars men's basketball team represented Washington State University for the 2007–08 NCAA Division I men's basketball season. The head coach was Tony Bennett. The team played its home games on Jack Friel Court in Beasley Coliseum in Pullman, Washington.

Roster

Schedule

|-
!colspan=9| Exhibition

|-
!colspan=9| Regular Season

|- 
!colspan=9| Pac-10 tournament

|-
!colspan=9| NCAA tournament

Washington State Cougars men's basketball seasons
Washington State Cougars
Washington State
Washington State
Washington State